Serob Davidovich Grigoryan (born 4 February 1995) is a Russian-born Armenian footballer who plays as a left-back for Alashkert and the Armenia national team.

Club career
On 9 December 2020, Grigoryan extended his contract with Pyunik. Grigoryan left Pyunik on 3 June 2022 after his contract expired.

On 30 January 2023, Alashkert announced the signings of Grigoryan.

International career
Grigoryan made his international debut for Armenia on 5 September 2020 in the UEFA Nations League against North Macedonia.

Career statistics

Club

International

Honours
Pyunik
 Armenian Premier League: 2021–22

References

External links
 
 
 
 

1995 births
Living people
Armenian footballers
Armenia youth international footballers
Armenia under-21 international footballers
Armenia international footballers
Russian footballers
Russian sportspeople of Armenian descent
Citizens of Armenia through descent
Association football fullbacks
PFC Krylia Sovetov Samara players
FC Shirak players
FC Pyunik players
Armenian Premier League players
Armenian First League players
Russian Second League players
Sportspeople from Vladikavkaz